The gajasimha or gajasiha (from  / ) is a mythical hybrid animal in Hindu mythology, appearing as a sinha or rajasiha (mythical lion) with the head or trunk of an elephant. It is found as a motif in Indian and Sinhalese art, and is used as a heraldic symbol in some Southeast Asian countries, especially Cambodia and Thailand. In Siam (pre-modern Thailand), the gajasimha served as the symbol of the kalahom, one of the king's two chief chancellors. It appears as a supporter in the coat of arms of Siam, in use from 1873 to 1910, and the royal arms of Cambodia, officially adopted in 1993.

Gallery

In heraldry

See also
List of legendary creatures in Hindu mythology
Yali (mythology)

References

Hindu legendary creatures
Mythological hybrids
Heraldic beasts
Cambodian legendary creatures
Thai legendary creatures